Artery Gear: Fusion is a turn-based mobile gacha game developed by Access and published by bilibili on Android and iOS platforms. The game was released in China in May 2021, in Japan on November 18, 2021, and globally on June 14, 2022.

Plot 
In a futuristic world, a mysterious force known as Puppets are besieging Earth and have laid waste to countless cities across the world. Faced with total annihilation, the two remaining forces of Earth, Frontier and Autoluna, join to form The Union to strike back against the invaders. The Commander of The Union is responsible for coordinating a team of Artery Gears to battle against the Puppets.

Development 
The Japanese release was announced in August 2021, with closed beta and pre-registrations beginning later that month. The Japanese version reached 500,000 pre-registrations ahead of release. Closed beta and pre-registrations for the global release began in May 2022, and launched globally in June 2022.

Reception 
Pocket Gamer highlighted the Quality-of-Life features and generous gacha system, but notes that there were translation issues. BunnyGaming.com echoes the translation issues and criticized the poor gacha pity system, but praises the game's visuals and auto-play features. Hardcore iOS remarks that "resource grinding and farming is one of the spots where improvements can be made," but otherwise considers Artery Gear: Fusion as "a decent timesink."

References

External links 
 Official website (Chinese)
 Official website (Japanese)
 Official website

2021 video games
Android (operating system) games
Gacha games
IOS games
Video games developed in China